The K-pop Hot 100 is a music singles chart in South Korea, launched by Billboard in conjunction with Billboard Korea on August 25, 2011. It is the second Asian Billboard chart after the Japan Hot 100. The chart used the same multimetric methodology as the US Hot 100 and rankings were compiled based on Hanteo Chart data, streaming and download data from Naver VIBE, and domestic radio and television music playback data. Updates were published on Billboard Korea's website every Tuesday, and appeared on billboard.com the following day.

Silvio Pietroluongo, Billboards Director of Charts, called the launch "a milestone event", as it would "provide the Korean music market with what we believe is Korea's most accurate and relevant song ranking." Pietroluongo further stated that they were "excited to be expanding Billboards globally recognized Hot 100 chart franchise into this country, and look forward to enhancing the K-Pop Hot 100 chart in the near future with additional data as well as creating new charts that showcase the breadth of Korean music". Due to the Korean market having a more active distribution of digital music compared to physical album sales at the time of the chart's launch, initial rankings solely reflected digital sales from major music sites, as well as downloads from mobile service sites, weighted using Billboards industry-standard formula. Weekly rankings were simultaneously announced in the United States and Korea on billboard.com in the international chart section of billboard.biz, in print editions of Billboard magazine, and also on the Billboard Korea website, billboard.co.kr. The first number-one song on the chart was "So Cool" by Sistar, on the issue dated September 3, 2011. Billboard suspended the chart in the United States effective the May 17, 2014 issue, but the final issue published was actually dated June 21. The Korean version of the chart was subsequently discontinued as of the July 16 issue date.

On December 20, 2017, Billboard officially announced the reactivation of the K-pop Hot 100, and the relaunch of the Billboard Korea website. Chart updates also resumed on billboard.com. The first issue of the reestablished chart was for the period May 29–June 4, 2017. Billboard suspended the Korean version of the chart without notice in 2022, effective the April 23 issue. The US edition of the chart was subsequently discontinued, effective the April 30 issue date. "Love Dive" by Ive was the final song to rank at number-one.

Hot 100 number-one singles

Achievement by artists

Artists with most number-one hits

Artists with most weeks at number one (all songs)

Artists with most number-one debuts (all songs)

Artists with most songs in top ten within the same week

Achievement by songs

Number-one debuts

Songs with most weeks at number one

Songs with most weeks in Top 10 (2011–2014)

Year-end charts

Source:

Notes

References

External links
Billboard K-Pop 100 chart on Billboard.com (2020–present)

2011 establishments in South Korea
2014 disestablishments in South Korea
2017 establishments in South Korea
2022 disestablishments in South Korea
Billboard charts
South Korean record charts